José Luis Marrufo Jiménez (born 12 May 1996) is a Venezuelan footballer who plays as a defender for Deportivo Táchira.

Club career
Marrufo signed for Mineros de Guayana ahead of the 2017 season.

Career statistics

Club

References

1996 births
Living people
Venezuelan footballers
Association football defenders
Asociación Civil Deportivo Lara players
Deportivo Táchira F.C. players
A.C.C.D. Mineros de Guayana players
Venezuelan Primera División players